Dürrbach may refer to:

Dürrbach (Neckar), a river of Baden-Württemberg, Germany, tributary of the Neckar
Dürrbach (Orla), a river of Thuringia, Germany, tributary of the Orla
Dürrbach, a river of the canton of Basel-Landschaft, Switzerland